Deborah Esther Goldberg is an American ecologist and Margaret B. Davis Distinguished University Professor Emerita and Arthur F. Thurnau Professor Emerita in the Department of Ecology and Evolutionary Biology at the University of Michigan.

Life 
Prior to becoming the Margaret B. Davis Distinguished University Professor, she was the Elzada U. Clover Collegiate Professor. In April 2015, the Journal of Ecology published a virtual issue of the journal in her honor, reprinting 10 papers that she had previously contributed to the journal. 

She is known for her study of competitive interactions in plant communities. Goldberg is a member of the board of This is My Earth, a non-profit organization dedicated to preserving biodiversity.

Awards
 2014, Fellow of the Ecological Society of America
 2014, Fellow of the American Association for the Advancement of Science
 2015, Journal of Ecology Eminent Ecologist Virtual Issue In Honor of Deborah Goldberg
 2018 Margaret B. Davis Distinguished University Professor of Ecology and Evolutionary Biology

External links

Personal Website at University of Michigan Department of Ecology and Evolutionary Biology

References

Living people
American ecologists
Women ecologists
University of Arizona alumni
Barnard College alumni
University of Michigan faculty
Fellows of the Ecological Society of America
Year of birth missing (living people)